Alex Wolf may refer to:
 Alex Wolf (bobsleigh)
 Alex Wolf (water polo)

See also
 Alexander Wolf, German biathlete
 Alexander L. Wolf, computer scientist